This article contains information about the literary events and publications of 1933.

Events
February – Having joined the Japanese Communist Party, the Chinese novelist Hu Feng is arrested and "badly beaten" in Tokyo for his protests against imperialism. Returning to the Republic of China as a popular hero, he is nevertheless prevented from joining the Communist Party of China by the rejection of him by a rival, Zhou Yang.
February 17 – The magazine News-Week is published for the first time in New York.
March 8 – Première of Federico García Lorca's play Blood Wedding (Bodas de Sangre) is held at the Teatro Beatriz in Madrid.
April 23 – Millosh Gjergj Nikolla is appointed schoolteacher among the Serbs of Vraka, Kingdom of Albania. The next two years bring his creative period as a short story writer, describing his sense of despair at being isolated in a backward region.

May – Nazi book burnings take place in Germany by the German Student Union, principally of works by Jewish intellectuals, leading to an Exilliteratur. Although his novels are spared (unlike those of his brother Heinrich Mann), Thomas Mann settles in Switzerland. Lion Feuchtwanger, on a lecture tour of the United States in January, has decided not to return to Germany; Bertolt Brecht has moved to Prague in February; and Alfred Döblin to Switzerland in March.
May 16–17 – In the Soviet Union, Joseph Stalin orders the NKVD to "preserve but isolate" Osip Mandelstam, after having been informed of the "Stalin Epigram"; Mandelstam is then arrested. A protest by literary figures, including Anna Akhmatova and Boris Pasternak, prompts Stalin to declare that he might "review the case" (he never will). His admiration for Pasternak as a poetic genius is strengthened when the latter asks for a private meeting to discuss "life and death" — although he never grants it, he instructs the NKVD to "leave that cloud-dweller [Pasternak] alone". 
June 
W. H. Auden has his "Vision of Agape".
Robert Walser, under treatment for schizophrenia since 1929, is placed in a sanatorium in Herisau, Switzerland. This ends his work as a writer, though he will live until 1956.
July – Poedjangga Baroe, the Indonesian avant-garde literary magazine, is first published, by Armijn Pane, Amir Hamzah and Sutan Takdir Alisjahbana.
October (approximate) – The name Inklings, previously used by a disbanded undergraduate group, is taken by an informal literary discussion group of University of Oxford academics, including C. S. Lewis and J. R. R. Tolkien.
October 8 – The General Union of Roma in Romania is set up by writer Gheorghe A. Lăzăreanu-Lăzurică, with Grigoraș Dinicu as honorary president; by 1934, it publishes the Romani-language newspaper O Ròm, and books of Romani mythology, edited by Constantin S. Nicolăescu-Plopșor.
November 7 – Premiere of Samuil Lehtțir's Biruința (Victory), at Tiraspol's State Theater; it is the first local play to have been produced within the Moldavian Autonomous Soviet Socialist Republic.
December
Codex Sinaiticus sold by the Soviet Union to the British Museum Library through the agency of Maggs Bros Ltd at a price of £100,000, the highest ever paid for a book at this time.
Raymond Chandler's first short story, the detective fiction "Blackmailers Don't Shoot", is published in the magazine Black Mask in the United States.
December 6 – In United States v. One Book Called Ulysses, U.S. District Judge John M. Woolsey rules that James Joyce's novel Ulysses is not as a whole pornographic and therefore cannot not be obscene.

New books

Fiction
Hervey Allen – Anthony Adverse
Jorge Amado – Cacau (Cacao)
Edwin Balmer and Philip Wylie – When Worlds Collide
Marjorie Bowen 
 Album Leaf
 The Last Bouquet: Some Twilight Tales
Pearl S. Buck
All Men Are Brothers (translation of Water Margin)
Sons
Edgar Rice Burroughs – Tarzan and the City of Gold
Dino Buzzati – Bàrnabo delle montagne
Erskine Caldwell – God's Little Acre
John Dickson Carr – The Mad Hatter Mystery
Leslie Charteris – Once More the Saint (also The Saint and Mr. Teal)
Agatha Christie
The Hound of Death
Lord Edgware Dies
Freeman Wills Crofts – The Hog's Back Mystery
A. J. Cronin – Grand Canary
Warwick Deeping – Two Black Sheep
Mircea Eliade – Bengal Nights (Mayitreyi)
Guy Endore – The Werewolf of Paris
Susan Ertz – The Proselyte
Miles Franklin – Bring the Monkey
Zona Gale – Papa La Fleur
John Galsworthy – One More River
Erle Stanley Gardner – The Case of the Sulky Girl
Matila Ghyka – Pluie d'étoiles
Anthony Gilbert 
 Death in Fancy Dress
 The Musical Comedy Crime
 Portrait of a Murderer
Walter Greenwood – Love on the Dole
Dashiell Hammett
The Thin Man
Woman In The Dark
Robert Hichens – The Paradine Case
James Hilton
Knight Without Armour
Lost Horizon
Volter Kilpi – Alastalon salissa (In the Parlour at Alastalo)
Pär Lagerkvist – Bödeln (The Hangman; novella)
Alexander Lernet-Holenia – I Was Jack Mortimer
E. C. R. Lorac 
 The Case of Colonel Marchand
 Death on the Oxford Road
Arthur Machen – The Green Round
Compton Mackenzie – Water on the Brain
Claude McKay – Banana Bottom
André Malraux – Man's Fate (La Condition humaine)
Caroline Pafford Miller – Lamb in His Bosom
A.A. Milne – Four Days' Wonder
Camil Petrescu – Patul lui Procust (The Bed of Procrustes)
Ellery Queen
The American Gun Mystery
The Siamese Twin Mystery
Raymond Queneau – Le Chiendent
Marjorie Kinnan Rawlings – South Moon Under
E. Arnot Robertson – Ordinary Families
Dorothy L. Sayers
Hangman's Holiday (short stories)
Murder Must Advertise
Bruno Schulz – The Street of Crocodiles (short stories, published as Sklepy cynamonowe, "Cinnamon Shops", in December, dated 1934)
Nan Shepherd – A Pass in the Grampians
Gertrude Stein – The Autobiography of Alice B. Toklas
Gladys Bronwyn Stern – Long Lost Father
Cecil Street 
 The Claverton Mystery
 The Motor Rally Mystery
 The Venner Crime
Phoebe Atwood Taylor – The Mystery of the Cape Cod Players
Angela Thirkell – High Rising
Thomas F. Tweed – Rinehard: a melodrama of the nineteen-thirties
S. S. Van Dine – The Kennel Murder Case
 Henry Wade – Mist on the Saltings
Helen Waddell – Peter AbelardHugh Walpole – VanessaH. G. Wells – The Shape of Things to ComeFranz Werfel – The Forty Days of Musa Dagh (Die vierzig Tage des Musa Dagh)
Nathanael West – Miss LonelyheartsDennis Wheatley – The Forbidden TerritoryAntonia White – Frost in MayVirginia Woolf – Flush: A BiographyChildren and young people
Marjorie Flack – The Story about PingNorman Hunter – The Incredible Adventures of Professor Branestawm (first in Professor Branestawm series)
Erich Kästner – The Flying ClassroomElizabeth Foreman Lewis – Young Fu of the Upper YangtzeArthur Ransome – Winter HolidayFelix Salten – Florian: The Emperor’s StallionDorothy Wall – Blinky Bill: the Quaint Little Australian (first in the Blinky Bill series of three books)

Drama
Tawfiq al-Hakim – Ahl el-Kahf (The People of the Cave)
Jean Anouilh – Mandarine
Clifford Bax – The Rose Without a Thorn
Ferdinand Bruckner – Die Rassen
Gordon Daviot (Josephine Tey) – Richard of Bordeaux
Selli Engler – Heil Hitler
Walter C. Hackett – Afterwards
Ian Hay – A Present from Margate
Hanns Johst – Schlageter
Sidney Kingsley – Men in White
Samuil Lehtțir – Biruința (Victory)
Federico García Lorca – Blood Wedding
W. Somerset Maugham – Sheppey
R. J. Minney – Clive of India
Ivor Novello – Fresh Fields
Eugene O'Neill – Ah, Wilderness!
J. B. Priestley – Laburnum Grove
Lennox Robinson – Drama at Inish
Mordaunt Shairp – The Green Bay Tree
John Van Druten – The Distaff Side
Maxim Ziese – Siebenstein

Poetry

Edwin James Brady – Wardens of the SeasBenjamin Fondane – UlysseMascha Kaléko – Das Lyrische Stenogrammheft: Verse vom AlltagOsip Mandelstam – "Stalin Epigram"
Vita Sackville-West – Collected PoemsFilip Shiroka – Zâni i zêmrësJ. Slauerhoff – SolearesW. B. Yeats – The Winding Stair and Other PoemsNon-fiction
Vera Brittain – Testament of YouthAlbert Einstein and Sigmund Freud – Warum Krieg?Benjamin Fondane – Rimbaud le voyouCarl Jung – Modern Man in Search of a SoulAgnes Mure Mackenzie – An Historical Survey of Scottish Literature to 1714George Orwell – Down and Out in Paris and LondonWilhelm Reich – The Mass Psychology of Fascism (Die Massenpsychologie des Faschismus)Upton Sinclair – Upton Sinclair Presents William FoxMuiris Ó Súilleabháin (Maurice O'Sullivan) – Fiche Bliain ag Fás (Twenty Years a-Growing)Jun'ichirō Tanizaki (谷崎 潤一郎) – In Praise of Shadows (陰翳礼讃, essay on aesthetics)

Births
January 1 – Joe Orton, English playwright (murdered 1967)
January 2 – Seiichi Morimura (森村誠一), Japanese author
January 4 – Phyllis Reynolds Naylor, American children's and adult novelist
January 9 – Wilbur Smith, South African historical novelist (died 2021)
January 13 – Shahnon Ahmad, Malaysian writer and politician (died 2017)
January 16 – Susan Sontag (Susan Rosenblatt), American novelist (died 2004)
January 25 – Alden Nowlan, Canadian poet and novelist (died 1983)
February 1 – Reynolds Price, American novelist and literary scholar (died 2011)
February 5 – B. S. Johnson, English novelist (died 1973)
February 12 – Costa-Gavras (Konstantinos Gavras), Greek-French film director and writer
February 20 – Zamenga Batukezanga, Congolese francophone writer and philanthropist (died 2000)
February 22 – Christopher Ondaatje, Ceylonese-born English travel writer, biographer and philanthropist
February 27 – Edward Lucie-Smith, Jamaican-born English writer, critic and broadcaster
March 17 – Penelope Lively (Penelope Low), Egyptian-born English novelist
March 18 – Sergio Pitol, Mexican fiction writer, translator and diplomat (died 2018)
March 19 – Philip Roth, American novelist (died 2018)
April 2 – György Konrád, Hungarian novelist, essayist, political dissident and President of PEN International (died 2019)
April 7 – Cong Weixi, Chinese author (died 2019)
April 14 – Boris Strugatsky, Russian sci-fi writer (died 2012)
April 24 – Patricia Bosworth, American writer/biographer (died 2020)
May 9 – Jessica Steele, English romance novelist (died 2020)
May 10 – Barbara Taylor Bradford (Barbara Taylor), English-born American novelist
May 12 – Stephen Vizinczey, Hungarian-born writer
May 29
 Abdul Rahman Munif, Arab writer (died 2004)
 Edward Whittemore, American novelist (died 1995)
June 9 – Vicente Leñero, Mexican novelist and playwright (died 2014)
June 11 – Martti Soosaar, Estonian journalist and author (died 2017)
June 20 – Claire Tomalin (Claire Delavenay), English journalist and biographer
June 25 – James Meredith, African-American civil rights activist, writer, political adviser and Air Force veteran
June 30 – Mauricio Rosencof, Uruguayan playwright, poet and journalist
July 2 – John Antrobus, English playwright and scriptwriter
July 4 – David Littman, English historian (died 2012)
July 10 – Kevin Gilbert, Australian writer and artist (died 1993)
July 13 – David Storey, English novelist and playwright (died 2017)
July 14 – Solange Fasquelle, French novelist (died 2016)
July 15 – M. T. Vasudevan Nair, Indian novelist
July 20 – Cormac McCarthy, American novelist, playwright and screenwriter
July 21
John Gardner, American novelist (died 1982)
Brigitte Reimann, German novelist (died 1973)
August 1 – Ko Un (Ko Untae), South Korean poet
August 7 – Jerry Pournelle, American science fiction writer (died 2017)
August 9 – M. T. Vasudevan Nair, Indian Malayalam-language writer
August 13 – Madhur Jaffrey, Indian actress and food writer
August 16 – Tom Maschler, Austrian-born English literary publisher (died 2020)
September 9 – Michael Novak, American philosopher and author (died 2017)
September 19 – Gilles Archambault, French Canadian novelist
September 27 – Paul Goble, English-American author and illustrator (died 2017)
October 11 – David Daniels, American visual poet (died 2008)
October 21 – Maureen Duffy, English poet, playwright, author and activist
October 24 – Norman Rush, American writer
November 1 
 Viačasłaŭ Adamčyk, Belarusian journalist, writer, playwright and screenwriter (died 2001)
 Samir Roychoudhury, Indian Bengali poet, philosopher of the Hungry generation (died 2016)
 Huub Oosterhuis, Dutch poet, theologian and liturgy reformer
November 13 – Peter Härtling, German novelist and poet (died 2017)
November 23 – Daniel Chavarría, Uruguayan writer and translator (died 2018)
December 2 – Kent Andersson, Swedish dramatist (died 2005)
December 22 – Jim Barnes, Native American poet and translator
December 31 – Edward Bunker, American crime novelist (died 2005)

Deaths
January 11 – Hugo Zöller, German explorer and journalist (born 1852)
January 21 – George Moore, Irish poet and novelist (born 1852)
January 29 – Sara Teasdale, American poet (born 1884; suicide)
January 31 – John Galsworthy, English novelist and dramatist (born 1867)
February 20 – Takiji Kobayashi (小林多喜二), Japanese writer (born 1903)
April 5 – Earl Derr Biggers, American novelist and playwright (heart attack, born 1884)
April 19 – E. W. Hobson, English writer on mathematics (born 1856)
April 24 – Janet Milne Rae, Scottish novelist (born 1844)
April 29 – Constantine Cavafy, Greek Alexandrine poet (born 1863)
April 30 – Anna de Noailles, French writer (born 1876)
May 26 – Horatio Bottomley, English journalist and fraudster (born 1860)
June 7 – Dragutin Domjanić, Croatian poet (born 1875)
July 8 – Anthony Hope (Anthony Hope Hawkins), English adventure novelist (born 1863)
August 12 – Alexandru Philippide, Romanian linguist and polemicist (atherosclerosis, born 1859)
September 20 – Annie Besant, English Theosophist writer (born 1847)
September 23 – György Almásy, Hungarian travel writer (born 1867)
September 25
Ring Lardner, American writer (born 1885)
Pascal Poirier, Canadian historian (born 1852)
October 30 – Herminie Templeton Kavanagh, Anglo-Irish-American short story writer (born 1861?)
November 12 – F. Holland Day, American publisher (born 1864)
November 20 – Augustine Birrell, English politician and author (born 1850)
November 28 – Minnie Earl Sears, American librarian (born 1873)
November 30 – Annie Armitt, English novelist and poet (born 1850)
December 4 – Stefan George, German poet and translator (born 1868)
December 27 – Georgina Castle Smith (pseudonym Brenda), English children's writer (born 1845)
 date unknown – Jennie M. Bingham, American author (born 1859)

Awards
James Tait Black Memorial Prize for fiction: A. G. Macdonell, England, Their EnglandJames Tait Black Memorial Prize for biography: Violet Clifton, The Book of TalbotNewbery Medal for children's literature: Elizabeth Foreman Lewis, Young Fu of the Upper YangtzeNobel Prize for literature: Ivan Alekseyevich Bunin
Pulitzer Prize for Drama: Maxwell Anderson, Both Your HousesPulitzer Prize for Poetry: Archibald MacLeish, ConquistadorPulitzer Prize for the Novel: T. S. Stribling, The Store''

References

 
Years of the 20th century in literature